The women's 800 metres event at the 1994 European Athletics Championships was held in Helsinki, Finland, at Helsinki Olympic Stadium on 7, 8, and 10 August 1994.

Medalists

Results

Final
10 August

Semi-finals
8 August

Semi-final 1

Semi-final 2

Heats
7 August

Heat 1

Heat 2

Heat 3

Participation
According to an unofficial count, 22 athletes from 14 countries participated in the event.

 (1)
 (1)
 (1)
 (2)
 (1)
 (2)
 (1)
 (2)
 (2)
 (1)
 (3)
 (2)
 (1)
 (2)

References

800 metres
800 metres at the European Athletics Championships
1994 in women's athletics